Brian Nelson Hill (born January 12, 1957) is a Canadian-born Austrian former ice hockey right winger. He played 19 games in the National Hockey League with the Hartford Whalers during the 1979–80 season. He moved to Europe in 1980 and spent eight seasons playing in the Austrian Hockey League before retiring in 1988. While there Hill became an Austrian citizen and played for the Austrian national team at the 1986 and 1987 World Championship B Pools.

Playing career
Hill played junior hockey in the Western Canada Hockey League for the Medicine Hat Tigers, scoring 53 goals and 51 assists for 104 points in his final year in 1976-77. Hill was drafted 31st overall by the Atlanta Flames in the 1977 NHL amateur draft and 43rd overall by the New England Whalers in the 1977 WHA Amateur Draft. Hill spent the next two seasons in the Central Hockey League for the Tulsa Oilers before he was claimed in the 1979 NHL Expansion Draft by the Hartford Whalers. He would spend just one season in the Whalers organization, splitting his time with the American Hockey League's Springfield Indians, and played 19 games for the Whalers, scoring a goal and an assist.

In 1980, Hill moved to the European leagues, with spells in Germany for EV Füssen and Austria for VEU Feldkirch and EHC Lustenau.

International play
Hill later obtained Austrian citizenship and represented them in the World Championship "B" Pool in 1986 and 1987. He had 5 points in 12 games.

Career statistics

Regular season and playoffs

International

External links

1957 births
Living people
Atlanta Flames draft picks
ATSE Graz players
Austrian ice hockey players
Canadian expatriate ice hockey players in the United States
Canadian ice hockey right wingers
Estevan Bruins players
EV Füssen players
Hartford Whalers players
Ice hockey people from Saskatchewan
Medicine Hat Tigers players
New England Whalers draft picks
Sportspeople from Regina, Saskatchewan
Springfield Indians players
Tulsa Oilers (1964–1984) players
VEU Feldkirch players